Rolf-Dieter Jaretzky (born 1935) is a pharmacist and philatelist who signed the Roll of Distinguished Philatelists in 1997.

He was the president of the Grand Prix Club (1994–1996) and the director of the Bundesstelle Ausstellungswesen des BDPh. He is a fellow of the Royal Philatelic Society of London.

He has formed leading collections of the philately of Mexico and Prussia.

References

Living people
1935 births
Signatories to the Roll of Distinguished Philatelists
German philatelists
Fellows of the Royal Philatelic Society London
German pharmacists
Recipients of the Cross of the Order of Merit of the Federal Republic of Germany